Biareh (also Romanized as Bīāreh, Beyāreh, and Bīyāreh; also known as Beyāre) is a village in Dena Rural District, in the Central District of Dena County, Kohgiluyeh and Boyer-Ahmad Province, Iran. At the 2006 census, its population was 382, in 106 families.

References 

Populated places in Dana County